Flawless (Haneshef, 'The Prom') is a 2018 Israeli drama film directed by Tal Granit and Sharon Maymon. In July 2018, it was one of five films nominated for the Ophir Award for Best Picture,  and led the industry with a record of twelve total nominations, of which it won four awards. Flawless was the first film in the history of Israeli cinema for which a transgender woman, Stav Strashko, was nominated for the Best Actress award.

Plot
Three unpopular high school student girls in Jerusalem decide to travel to Kyiv to get plastic surgery, hoping this will change their lives for the better and help them find their dream dates for the prom. On their way, Tigist and Keshet discover that Eden has her own reasons to embark on this journey.

Cast
 Stav Strashko as Eden
 Netsanet Mekonnen as Mika
  as Keshet
 Asi Levi as Keren

References

External links
 

2018 films
2018 drama films
2018 LGBT-related films
2010s teen drama films
Israeli teen drama films
Israeli LGBT-related films
2010s Hebrew-language films
LGBT-related drama films
Films about trans women
Films about proms
Works about plastic surgery
Films set in Jerusalem
Films set in Kyiv